Wálter Alberto Flores Condarco (born October 29, 1978 in Oruro) is a retired Bolivian football midfielder who last played for Bolívar.

Club career
Flores began playing professional football in 2000 for Club San José in his native Oruro. After six years and 140 games played in first division, he transferred to Real Potosí. Fourteen appearances seemed to be enough to convince The Strongest, which signed him for the 2007 season. After two great years with the atigrados, Flores decided to move to the other side of town, and joined rival team Bolívar in 2009.

International career
Between 2004 and 2012, Flores has gained 31 caps for the Bolivia national football team, scoring 1 goal. He represented his country in 15 FIFA World Cup qualification matches.

Honours

References

External links
 
 
 

1978 births
Living people
People from Oruro, Bolivia
Association football midfielders
Bolivian footballers
Bolivia international footballers
Club San José players
Club Real Potosí players
The Strongest players
Club Bolívar players
2004 Copa América players
2011 Copa América players